In the run up to the 2015 Portuguese legislative election, various organisations carried out opinion polling to gauge voting intention in Portugal. Results of such polls are displayed in this article.

The date range for these opinion polls are from the previous general election, held on 5 June 2011, to the day the next election was held, on 4 October 2015.

Graphical summary

Party vote
Poll results are listed in the table below in reverse chronological order, showing the most recent first. The highest percentage figure in each polling survey is displayed in bold, and the background shaded in the leading party's colour. In the instance that there is a tie, then no figure is shaded but both are displayed in bold. The lead column on the right shows the percentage-point difference between the two parties with the highest figures. Poll results use the date the survey's fieldwork was done, as opposed to the date of publication.

Seat projections
Opinion polls showing seat projections are displayed in the table below. The highest seat figures in each polling survey have their background shaded in the leading party's colour. In the instance that there is a tie, then no figure is shaded. 116 seats are required for an absolute majority in the Assembly of the Republic.

Notes

References

External links 
 Marktest Opinion Poll Tracker
 ERC - Official publication of polls

Opinion polling for elections
2015